Vauxhall is the name of two places in New Zealand:
Vauxhall, Auckland, suburb of North Shore City
Vauxhall, Dunedin, a suburb of Dunedin